Siwan Assembly constituency is an assembly constituency in Siwan district in the Indian state of Bihar. In 2015 Bihar Legislative Assembly election, Siwan will be one of the 36 seats to have VVPAT enabled electronic voting machines.

Overview
As per Delimitation of Parliamentary and Assembly constituencies Order, 2008, No. 105 Siwan Assembly constituency is composed of the following: Siwan community development block including Siwan Municipal Council; Lakri, Pakri, Aurae, Lakri Dargah, Kailgarh Uttar, Kailgarh Dakhin, Sunderpur and Hathigai gram panchayats of Barharia CD Block.

Siwan Assembly constituency is part of No. 18 Siwan (Lok Sabha constituency) . The former MLA Vyasdev Prasad of BJP had won this particular assembly seat 3 times in a row since 2005. Present MLA of Siwan is Shri Awadh Bihari Choudhary from RJD elected in 2020.

Members of Legislative Assembly

Election Results

2020

References

External links
 

Assembly constituencies of Bihar
Politics of Siwan district